Spain competed at the 1950 European Athletics Championships in Brussels, Belgium, from 23–27 August 1950.

It was the first time Spain sent athletes to compete in a European Athletic Championship.

Results

Men
Track & road events

Field events

Nations at the 1950 European Athletics Championships
1950
European Athletics Championships